Jaime "El Mono" Rovira was a Cuban baseball infielder in the Cuban League. He played with Carmelita in 1908, and Club Fé from 1908 to 1910. He also played for Havana Park during the 1911 Cuban-American Major League Clubs Series.

References

External links

Year of birth missing
Cuban League players
Cuban baseball players
Club Fé players
Carmelita players
Year of death unknown